The Mauritanian gerbil (Gerbillus mauritaniae) is distributed mainly in northern Mauritania.  Some authorities place it in a separate genus, Monodia. It is also sometimes considered a subspecies of the Sudan gerbil.

References

  Database entry includes a brief justification of why this species is listed as data deficient

Gerbillus
Rodents of Africa
Mammals described in 1943
Endemic fauna of Mauritania
Taxobox binomials not recognized by IUCN
Taxa named by Henri Heim de Balsac